Enoch Wright House is a historic building in Peters Township, Washington County, Pennsylvania, United States. The house was built sometime around 1815 by Enoch Wright on land he inherited from his father, Joshua, who moved to the area in around 1772. Wright family members lived in the house until 1862, when they began to rent it out. In 1972, they donated the house to the Peters Creek Historical Society, which now uses it as a museum.

Bricks for the house were manufactured on site. The house was built for two families, with separate kitchens on each end. The house's 12 rooms each have their own fireplaces.

References

Houses on the National Register of Historic Places in Pennsylvania
Federal architecture in Pennsylvania
Houses completed in 1815
Houses in Washington County, Pennsylvania
National Register of Historic Places in Washington County, Pennsylvania
1815 establishments in Pennsylvania